, also known as Chiyoda City in English, is a special ward located in central Tokyo, Japan. It consists of the Imperial Palace and a surrounding radius of about a kilometer. As of October 2020, the ward has a population of 66,680, and a population density of 5,709 people per km², making it by far the least populated of the special wards. The total area is 11.66 km², of which the Imperial Palace, Hibiya Park, National Museum of Modern Art, and Yasukuni Shrine take up approximately 2.6 km², or 22% of the total area.

Chiyoda is an economic powerhouse; the small area east of the palace in the districts of Otemachi, Marunouchi and Yurakucho (colloquially "Daimaruyu") houses the headquarters of 19 Fortune 500 companies, is the source of roughly 10% of the combined revenue of all Japanese companies, and produced the equivalent of around 1/4th of the GDP of the country in 2017. With a day population of around 850,000, its day/night population ratio is by far the highest of all municipalities in Japan.

Chiyoda is also the political center of the country. Chiyoda, literally meaning "field of a thousand generations", inherited the name from the Chiyoda Castle, the other name for Edo Castle, which is the site of the present-day Imperial Palace. With the seat of the Emperor in the Imperial Palace at the ward's center, many government institutions, such as the National Diet, the Prime Minister's Official Residence, the Supreme Court, ministries, and agencies are also located in Chiyoda, as are Tokyo landmarks such as Tokyo Station, Yasukuni Shrine and the Budokan. The neighborhood Akihabara is also located in Chiyoda, as are twenty embassies and consulates.

The ward was formed in 1947 as a merger of Kanda and Kōjimachi wards following Tokyo City's transformation into Tokyo Metropolis. The modern Chiyoda ward exhibits contrasting Shitamachi and Yamanote geographical and cultural divisions. The Kanda area is in the core of Shitamachi, the original commercial center of Edo-Tokyo. On the other hand, the western part of the Kōjimachi area typically represents a Yamanote district.

History
Chiyoda has been a site of a number of historical events.

In 1860, the assassination of Ii Naosuke took place outside the Sakurada Gate of the Imperial Palace.
In 1932, assassins attacked and killed prime minister Inukai Tsuyoshi.
In 1936, an attempted coup d'état, the February 26 Incident, occurred.
In 1960, Socialist Party leader Inejirō Asanuma was assassinated in Hibiya Hall.
In 1995, members of Aum Shinrikyo carried out the Tokyo subway sarin attack.

Geography 
At the tip of Musashino plateau, Chiyoda is located at the very heart of former Tokyo City in eastern mainland Tokyo. The central area of the ward is furthermore occupied by the Imperial Palace. The east side of the ward, bordering Chūō, is the location of Tokyo Station. The south side, bordering Minato, encompasses Hibiya Park and the National Diet Building. It is almost exclusively occupied by administrations and agencies. The west and northwest are primarily upper class residential; the Yasukuni Shrine is also there. The "high lantern" of Kudanzaka slope was not originally built as a lighthouse, but was built as a lantern for the Shrine. Originally steep and with steps, the slope was considerably softened during remediation after the Kanto earthquake. To the north and northeast of the ward are several residential neighborhoods and the Akihabara commercial district.

Politics and government

Local government
Chiyoda is run by a directly elected mayor and a city assembly of 25 elected members. The current mayor is Takaaki Higuchi.

Metropolitan representation 
For the Metropolitan Assembly, Chiyoda forms a single-member electoral district. It had been represented by Liberal Democrats for 50 years until the landslide 2009 election when then 26-year-old Democratic newcomer Zenkō Kurishita unseated 70-year-old former Metropolitan Assembly president and six term assemblyman, Liberal Democrat Shigeru Uchida. In the 2013 election, no Democrat contested the seat and Uchida won back the district against a Communist and two independents.

The Tokyo Fire Department has its headquarters in Ōtemachi in Chiyoda.

National representation 
For the national House of Representatives, Chiyoda, together with Minato and Shinjuku, forms the prefecture's 1st electoral district since the electoral reform of the 1990s. The district is currently represented by Constitutional Democrat Banri Kaieda.

The ward is also home to the National Diet, the Supreme Court of Japan and the residence of the Prime Minister of Japan and is the political nerve center of Japan.

Diplomatic missions

Several countries operate their embassies in Chiyoda.

 
 
 
 
 
 
 
 
 
  (Chongryon)

Cityscape 
On December 31, 2001, Chiyoda had 6,572 buildings which were four stories or taller.

Some of the districts in Chiyoda are actually not inhabited, either because they are parks (Hibiya Koen), because they consist only of office buildings (Otemachi or Marunouchi), and/or because they are extremely small. The area on the eastern side of Akihabara Station is the location of several districts that cover at most a few buildings. Kanda-Hanaokachō is, for example, limited to the Akihabara Station and the Yodobashi Camera department store. Understanding the address system in the Kanda area can be particularly troublesome for non-locals.

Districts and neighborhoods

Kōjimachi Area 
, former Kōjimachi Ward (Kōjimachi-ku)
 Kojimachi, a former merchant area along the Shinjuku-Dori avenue, upper-class residential with a couple of offices.
 The Banchō area (nowadays consisting of six neighborhoods, from Ichibancho to Rokubanchō, and historically including Fujimi as well as the western sides of Kudanminami and Kudankita), an upper class residential area, home of the embassies of Belgium, Paraguay, Luxemburg, the UK, Israel and the Apostolic Nunciature.
 Chiyoda - "1-1 Chiyoda, Chiyoda-ku" is the official address of the Imperial Palace
 Fujimi, location of the Residence of the Philippine Ambassador to Tokyo, Chongryon, as well as several educational facilities
 Hayabusachō - Houses the Supreme Court of Japan and the National Theater
 Hibiya Kōen - Address for Hibiya Park, a large park south of the Imperial Palace
 Hirakawachō, a mix between residences and medium side offices
 Iidabashi
 Kasumigaseki - The nerve center of Japan's administrative agencies
 Kioichō - The name, ki-o-i, is a three-kanji acronym consisting of one kanji each from the names of the Kishū Domain, Owari Domain, and Ii clan, whose daimyō residences were here during the Edo period
 Kitanomaru Park, North of the imperial palace, location of the Budokan
 Kōjimachi - Older residential and commercial neighborhood on the west side of the Imperial Palace, home to the embassy of Ireland
 Kōkyo Gaien - large open gardens in front of the Imperial palace
 Kudanminami and Kudankita districts, around the station of Kudanshita - Northwest side of the Imperial Palace, home to Yasukuni Shrine. It is a prestigious residential and business zone. 
 Marunouchi - Located between Tokyo Station and the Imperial Palace, one of Tokyo's traditional commercial centers
 Nagatachō - The location of the National Diet; also houses the Hie Shrine
 Ōtemachi - North of Marunouchi, a district of key financial Japanese institutions and major national newspapers
 Uchisaiwaichō, close to the Hibiya Park, location of the Imperial Hotel, as well as head offices of banks (especially Mizuho Financial Group).
 Yūrakuchō - South of Marunouchi, part of the Tokyo Station business district.

Kanda Area 
. Soto-Kanda, at the northern corner of the ward, home to the famous Akihabara electronics district.

Uchi-Kanda
Soto-Kanda
Nishi-Kanda
Higashi-Kanda
Iwamotochō
Kajichō
Hitotsubashi

The list below consists of the many smaller neighborhoods of the Kanda area, for which a modernization of the addressing system has not been enforced yet except Kanda-Sarugakuchō and Kanda-Misakichō. All officially start with the prefix "Kanda-", but it is sometimes omitted in daily life. Note that Iwamotochō and Kanda-Iwamotochō are different districts (as is the case for Kajichō and Kanda-Kajichō)

Kanda-Aioichō
Kanda-Awajichō
Kanda-Izumichō
Kanda-Iwamotochō
Kanda-Ogawamachi
Kanda-Kajichō
Kanda-Kitanorimonochō
Kanda-Konyachō
Kanda-Sakumagashi
Kanda-Sakumachō
Kanda-Sarugakuchō
Kanda-Jinbōchō
Kanda-Sudachō
Kanda-Surugadai
Kanda-Tachō
Kanda-Tsukasamachi
Kanda-Tomiyamachō
Kanda-Nishikichō
Kanda-Nishifukudachō
Kanda-Neribeichō
Kanda-Hanaokachō
Kanda-Higashikonyachō
Kanda-Higashimatsushitachō
Kanda-Hirakawachō
Kanda-Matsunagachō
Kanda-Mikurachō
Kanda-Misakichō
Kanda-Mitoshirochō

Economy 

On October 1, 2001, Chiyoda had 36,233 business establishments with 888,149 employees.

0verflow, Asahi Glass, Bungeishunjū, Calbee, Creatures Inc., Datam Polystar, DIC Corporation, Dowa Holdings, Furukawa Electric, HAL Laboratory, Hakusensha, Jaleco, The Japan FM Network Company, Japan Freight Railway Company, Japan Post Holdings, JFE Holdings, Kadokawa Corporation, KDDI, Konica Minolta, Kyowa Hakko Kirin, Lixil Group Corporation, Maeda Corporation, Mitsubishi Estate, MCDecaux, Mitsubishi UFJ Financial Group, Mizuho Financial Group, Nabtesco, Nakano Corporation, New Otani, Nikken Sekkei, Nippon Cable, Nippon Flour Mills, Nippon Paper Industries, Nippon Soda, Nippon Suisan Kaisha, Nitto Boseki, NTT docomo, Orient Watch Company, Seibu Kaihatsu, Seven & i Holdings, Shin-Etsu Chemical, Shogakukan, Shueisha, SMC Corporation, Sony Music Entertainment Japan, Tanaka Kikinzoku Group, Toho, Toho Zinc, Tokio Marine Nichido, Tokuyama Corporation,
Tokyo FM, Toppan Printing, Ushio, Inc., Yamazaki Baking Company, Vie de France, YKK Group, and Yomiuri Shimbun are headquartered in Chiyoda. Mazda has an office in Chiyoda.

Foreign operations 
Foreign companies with Japanese divisions in Chiyoda include Aeroméxico, AMI Japan (subsidiary of American Megatrends), Chloé Japan, Hewlett-Packard Japan, LVMH, Ropes & Gray, Sidley Austin, Sunoco, and Swiss International Air Lines.

Former operations 
Japanese companies which formerly had their headquarters in Chiyoda include All Nippon Airways, Bandai Visual, Galaxy Airlines, Japan Airlines, Japan Asia Airways, Mitsui Chemicals, Nippon Cargo Airlines, Taito, and Yamato Life. In 1998 Fujitsu operated a branch office in Chiyoda. At one point, Cantor Fitzgerald had an office in Chiyoda.

Attractions 

 Akihabara
 Hibiya Park
 Imperial Palace
 National Diet Building
 Nippon Budokan
 Tokyo International Forum
 Tokyo Station
 Tokyo Takarazuka Theater

Transportation 

Home to the massive Tokyo station with a multitude of subways, railways and long-distance services.

Points of historical interest

Education

Primary and secondary schools 

, Chiyoda has eight elementary schools, with 2,647 students, and five junior high schools with 1,123 students. Public high schools are operated by the Tokyo Metropolitan Government Board of Education.

Public schools 
Prefectural high schools
Hibiya High School

Municipal secondary (junior-senior high) schools
 - Kudankita

Municipal junior high schools
Kōjimachi Junior High School (麹町中学校) - Hirakawachō
Kanda-Hitotsubashi Junior High School (神田一橋中学校) - Hitotsubashi
There is a freedom of choice system for junior high schools in Chiyoda Ward, and so there are no specific junior high school attendance zones.

Municipal elementary schools
Banchō Elementary School (番町小学校) - Rokubanchō
Chiyoda Elementary School (千代田小学校) - Tsukasamachi
 It was created in April 1993 (Heisei 5) as a merger of Chisakura Elementary School (千桜小学校) and Kanda Elementary School (神田小学校), and it also took a portion of the former boundary of Nagatatcho Elementary School (永田町小学校).
Fujimi Elementary School (富士見小学校) - Fujimi
Izumi Elementary School (和泉小学校) - Izumichō
 Established in 1993, it is a consolidation of Imagawa Elementary School (今川小学校) and Sakuma Elementary School (佐久間小学校).
Kudan Elementary School (九段小学校) - Sanbanchō
Kōjimachi Elementary School (麹町小学校) - Kōjimachi
It was formed from the merger of the former Kōjimachi Elementary and Nagatacho Elementary School (永田町小学校).
Ochanomizu Elementary School (お茶の水小学校) - Fujimi
It was created in 1993 as the merger of Kinka Elementary School (錦華小学校), Nishikanda Elementary School (西神田小学), and Ogawa Elementary School (小川小学校). The Kinka building became the Ochanomizu Elementary building.
Shohei Elementary School (昌平小学校) - 
It was established in 1993. It is on the site of the former Horin Elementary School (芳林小学校). It was initially held in the previous Awaji Elementary School (淡路小学校) before its current building opened in 1996.

Private schools 
Primary and secondary schools
The Tokyo Chinese School, located in  
Previously the Lycée Franco-Japonais de Tokyo was in Fujimi in this ward.

Secondary schools
, private girls' school
, private girls' school
, private girls' school, affiliated with Kyoritsu Women's University
, private girls' school
, private girls' school
, private girls' school
, private girls' school, affiliated with Otsuma Women's University
, private girls' school, affiliated with Shirayuri Women's University
, private girls' school, affiliated with Wayo Women's University
Gyosei Junior and Senior High School, private boys' school
, private boys' school

, affiliated with Nishogakusha University

Primary schools
Gyosei Primary School (暁星小学校), boys' school
Futaba Gakuen Elementary School (雙葉小学校), girls' school
Shirayuri Joshi Gakuen Elementary School (白百合学園小学校), girls' school, affiliated with Shirayuri Women's University

Colleges and universities
Hitotsubashi University's Graduate School of International Corporate Strategy is located in the National Center of Sciences in Hitotsubashi. Both of the Sophia University Campuses are in western Chiyoda. The main Yotsuya campus lies adjacent to Yotsuya Station and the Ichigaya Campus just south of Ichigaya Station.

Globis University Graduate School of Management which is the largest business school in Japan is also located in Chiyoda. Hosei University, Meiji University, Senshu University, Nihon University and so on are located in the area.

Libraries 
Chiyoda operates four public libraries; they are the Chiyoda Library, Yobancho Library, Shohei Library, and Kanda Library. Tokyo operates the Tokyo Metropolitan Library Hibiya Library. The Japanese government operates the National Diet Library and the National Archives. Ishikawa Enterprise Foundation Ochanomizu Library is a nearby private library.

Parks and recreation 

East Imperial Garden, located on the eastern portion of the Tokyo Imperial Palace grounds and housing the castle tower and the outer defense positions of the former Edo Castle, opened to the public in 1968. Kitanomaru Park, located on Edo Castle's former northern section, has the Tokyo National Museum of Modern Art and the Nippon Budokan, a venue for performances. Chidorigafuchi Boat Arena and Chidorigafuchi Moat Path includes a waterway for boats. National Diet Building Park, located adjacent to the Diet Building and divided in two by a street, includes American dogwoods planted to symbolize the relations between the United States and Japan. Hibiya Park, Japan's first western-style park, includes restaurants, open-air concert halls, and tennis courts. Imperial Palace Outer Garden, in the front of Nijubashi Bridge, serves as a jogging trail and a tourist site.

References

External links 

Chiyoda City Official Website 

 
Wards of Tokyo
Diplomatic districts
Environmental model cities